Daniel Karl-Olov Alm (born December 15, 1971, in Björköby, Sweden) is a Swedish pastor and leader within the Swedish Pentecostal movement.
Alm is the General Superintendent of the Pentecostal Alliance of Independent churches (since 2016) and head pastor of the Pentecostal church in Västerås (since 2006). Alm has been head pastor of the Pentecostal churches in Oskarström (1994–1999 and 2000–2006).

Alm has written several books about Christian faith, and been a contributor to papers and magazines including Dagen, Världen idag, and Vestmanlands Läns Tidning.

Bibliography

Books 
Privat kyrka - orka bry sig om gemenskap, 2010, 
Praktisk kristendom - visdom från Jakobs brev i Nya Testamentet, 2012, 
Andens frukter och gåvor, 2013, 
Till uppbyggelse, 2016,    
Kallad, bekräftad, överlåten, 2018, 
Tungotal tänkande tjänande, 2019,

References

External links 
 Daniel Alm's webpage
Pingst Västerås hemsida (in Swedish)
Pingströrelsens hemsida (in Swedish)

1971 births
Living people
People from Vetlanda Municipality
Swedish religious leaders